Crestline Hotels & Resorts, Inc. is an independent hospitality management company headquartered in Fairfax, Virginia, United States. Founded in 2000, the company currently manages 124 hotels, resorts and conference and convention centers with nearly 17,600 rooms in 29 states and the District of Columbia. Crestline Hotels & Resorts manages 9 independent properties in major United States markets such as Atlanta, New York City, and Washington DC.  Crestline also manages properties under numerous brands.

Crestline Hotels & Resorts' daily operations are led by President & CEO, James Carroll. They are headquartered in Fairfax, VA.

In January 2009, Crestline Hotels & Resorts launched “EarthPact,” a green initiative that the company says addresses sustainability across multiple disciplines within the company.

References

External links
Crestline Hotels & Resorts; Raising the Standard in Hotel Management

Hospitality companies of the United States
Companies based in Virginia